The 1962 Australia Cup Final was the first Australia Cup Final, the final match of the 1962 Australia Cup. It was played at Wentworth Park in Sydney, Australia, on 9 December 1962, contested by Yugal and St George Budapest. Yugal won the match 8–1, with four goals from Tiko Jelisavčić, two goals from Eric Schwarts and one goal each for Tony Nincevich and Slavko Pacanin.

Route to the final

Yugal

St George Budapest

Match

Details

References

December 1962 sports events in Australia
Soccer in Sydney
Australia Cup (1962–1968) finals